Massoniinae is a flowering plant subtribe in the tribe Hyacintheae.

Genera 
 Daubenya
 Drimiopsis
 Eucomis
 Lachenalia
 Ledebouria
 Massonia
 Merwilla
 Resnova
 Schizocarphus
 Spetaea
 Veltheimia

References 

 Manning, J.C., Goldblatt, P., & Fay, M.F. (2004) A revised generic synopsis of Hyacintheaceae in sub-Saharan Africa, based on molecular evidence, including new combinations and the new tribe Pseudoprospereae. Edinburgh Journal of Botany, 60: 533–568. Includes Resnova and Drimiopsis in Ledebouria s.l..
 Lebatha, P., Buys, M.H. & Stedje, B. (2006) Ledebouria, Resnova and Drimiopsis: A tale of three genera. Taxon 55: 643–652. Does not support the inclusion of Resnova and Drimiopsis in Ledebouria s.l.

External links 

Scilloideae
Plant subtribes